This is a list of videos and DVDs produced for The Adventures of Tintin 1991–92 TV series, based on the comics series by Belgian cartoonist Hergé.

The full series has been available three times on video, with individual episodes released by Lumiere in 1994 and Mollin Video in 2000, while Anchor Bay released a series of five videos, containing four episodes on each (and five on the last one) in 2002–2003.

The series has also been released twice on Region 2 DVD by Anchor Bay, but with no subtitles or extra features. The first was as an exclusive 5-disc DVD release for HMV with soundtracks in English, French and Spanish. The second was a general 10-disc release but with the soundtrack only in English. The 10-disc set is in the canonical order, although the limited edition 5-disc set places The Blue Lotus first (presumably from looking at the back of one of the books). On 10 October 2011, Anchor Bay re-released the series in a 5 disc DVD set and released it for the first time on Blu-ray, also in a 5 disc set. The Blu-ray and 5 DVD-re-release feature a 16:9 transfer that has been cropped from the 4:3 image.

In France, the full series has been available for years on video, produced by Citel. At the beginning of 2006, Citel also released the series on Region 2 DVD. The DVDs are packaged in two ways. In one packaging, there are 21 DVDs with one episode per DVD and audio in French and English but no subtitles. A full set was issued in a wooden box. The second packaging has two episodes on each DVD (3 on one). These have audio in French, English and Spanish and subtitles in the same three languages plus French for the hard of hearing. Some of them also have subtitles in Portuguese. Recently the series was issued as a partwork by Éditions Atlas in France, with an accompanying booklet featuring information about the episode and behind-the-scenes artwork.

In Canada, the series has been released on Region 1 DVD on two 5-disc box sets (with all discs individually available), with French and English language tracks with subtitles. Each DVD contains two episodes, arranged in two boxed sets of ten episodes each. Tintin in America is not planned for release. Except for the episodes which, joined together, form story arcs (The Secret of the Unicorn/Red Rackham's Treasure, The Seven Crystal Balls/Prisoners of the Sun and Destination Moon/Explorers on the Moon), the episodes have no specific order on the discs.  It is more French than English; for on-screen text, English subtitles automatically appear. The Canadian editions were released in the US on 18 August 2009.

In New Zealand & Australia, a 6-disc DVD box set of the series was released by Madman Entertainment in 2004, in the order in which the comics were released.  The first three discs had four episodes, the last three had three episodes.  Each disc comes with information on the comic books, character profiles, and no subtitles. Madmad subsequently released a "Remastered" edition with the picture cropped for a 16:9 frame.

In India, the series has been released on both DVD and VCD by Moser Baer Home Entertainment once before. Now the series is available in two formats on DVD and VCD from Eagle Home Entertainment. First is the boxed format, in which there are 21 DVDs with one episode per DVD and audio in English with English subtitles. The full set was issued in a wooden box as part of 80th anniversary celebration by Eagle. The second format is individual episodes sold separately with audio in English with English subtitles. The DVDs are region free in both cases.

In Brazil, the series has been released on DVD in July 2008. Each season has been released separately on 3 box-sets. There's also a special deluxe collector's edition box-set with all 39 episodes on 9 discs. The series has been released by Log On Multimedia and the region-free DVDs contains audio in English and Portuguese and subtitles in Portuguese.

In Germany, a Video version was distributed in the 1990s by ATLAS Film. In 2004 it was released on Region 2 DVD, on two 4-disc box sets (with all discs individually available), with German and French language tracks. In 2005 an anniversary edition, with all 39 episodes on 8-disc's came out.

In May 2011, Shout! Factory and Vivendi Entertainment acquired the rights (under license from Nelvana) to release the series on DVD in Region 1. They have subsequently released the first two seasons on DVD. The third and final season was released on 21 August 2012.

Region 1
Season 1, 22 November 2011
Season 2, 20 March 2012
Season 3, 21 August 2012

Europe Complete Series Set
A limited edition of Ellipse-Nelvana's The Adventures of Tintin TV cartoon series was released as its HMV exclusive in Europe by Anchor Bay Entertainment.  It contains all 21 full-length episodes on 5 DVDs.

Disc 1
 The Blue Lotus (50 minutes)
 Tintin in America (25 minutes)
 The Broken Ear (50 minutes)
 Cigars of the Pharaoh (50 minutes)

Disc 2
 The Black Island (50 minutes)
 King Ottokar's Sceptre (50 minutes)
 The Crab with the Golden Claws (50 minutes)
 The Shooting Star (25 minutes)

Disc 3
 The Secret of the Unicorn (50 minutes)
 Red Rackham's Treasure (25 minutes)
 The Seven Crystal Balls (50 minutes)
 Prisoners of the Sun (50 minutes)

Disc 4
 Land of Black Gold (50 minutes)
 Destination Moon (50 minutes)
 Explorers on the Moon (50 minutes)
 The Calculus Affair (50 minutes)

Disc 5
 The Red Sea Sharks (50 minutes)
 Tintin in Tibet (50 minutes)
 The Castafiore Emerald (50 minutes)
 Flight 714 (50 minutes)
 Tintin and the Picaros (50 minutes)

Australian 75th Anniversary Set
Contains six discs. The episodes are viewed in the same way as the comics are released. The first three discs have four episodes, the last three have three.

References

Home video releases
Lists of home video releases